San Nicolás Hidalgo is a town and municipality in Oaxaca in south-western Mexico. The municipality covers an area of 56.14 km². 
It is part of the Silacayoapam District in the Mixteca Region.

As of 2005, the municipality had a total population of 936.

References

Municipalities of Oaxaca